The following lists events that happened in 1916 in El Salvador.

Incumbents
President: Carlos Meléndez Ramírez
Vice President: Alfonso Quiñónez Molina

Events

References

 
El Salvador
1910s in El Salvador
Years of the 20th century in El Salvador
El Salvador